Kahlik Bolaghi may refer to:
 Kahlik Bolaghi, East Azerbaijan